Moritz Jahn (27 March 1884 in Lilienthal, Lower Saxony – 19 January 1979 in Göttingen) was a Lower German novelist and an educator. He was also a poet, best known for writing poetry as well such as ballad, lyric, and narratives. Jahn was born in Lilienthal, a suburb in Lower Saxony to a Low German family. He was the member for Nazi Party. He has written notable books with narration such as Frangula and Lucifer. He was active from the 1920s to 1950s.

Life 
Moritz Jahn, the first Volksschule teacher, was studying from 1921 to 1925 in German studies and art history. During World War II in 1943, where he was working at the school services he made his last activity as a principal in Geismar and had been pensioned in 1944, free as a writer. Between 1933 and 1935, he was twice as a member of the Nazi Party and was, in 1941, a subscriber of the Joseph Goebbels organisation Weimarer Dichtertreffen, by the National Socialist of the European Writers Union which had been founded. Jahn held on the meeting a network, in that he was one of the literature emigrants sharp attack. In the time of the National Socialism in Nazi Germany which he has been appointed as a doctorate of the University of Göttingen in 1944. In the quarter of Göttinger where has the place named after him calledMoritz-Jahn-Haus On 27 March 2014, the state of Göttingen celebrated his 130th birthday with a ceremony. In 1959, he was awarded for the Fritz Reuter Prize and Klaus Groth Prize.

Career 
His notable work was originally written in Lower German language, which he was written including lyric poetry, ballads, narratives and historical accounts, some of them in brief form and describes his poems with the impulse as an ambitious writer to devote himself to the Low German. His parts of work which it was also mainly located in the Lower German region, could be characterized as meditative or tragic, while other types like full of satirical elements. Jahn's favourite theme is the life of nerds and their failure society, such as in gasketed and ballads collection featuring  Ulenspegel un Jan Dood (1933). His other well-known works are featured with narrative novels including Frangula (1933), the novella De Moorfro (1950) and Lucifer (1956). He published an important poetry collection Unkepunz, Ein deutsches Gesicht (1931) and Im weiten Land (1938). He died on 19 January 1979, at the age of 94.

Further reading

in German 
 Stellmacher, Dieter (Hrsg.): Studien zu Moritz Jahn, Verlag C. Bösendahl Rinteln 1986 (= Name und Wort. Göttinger Arbeiten zur niederdeutschen Philologie, Bd. 8) - 
Friedrich Ernst Peters:  "'''Ulenspegel un Jan Dood': Die Gestalt eines Dichters aus Niederdeutschland", in: ders., Im Dienst der Form. Gesammelte Aufsätze, Göttingen: Deuerlichsche Verlagsbuchhandlung, 1947, S. 49-59. UB Potsdam
 Blome, Hermann: "Moritz Jahn". In: D[eter] P. Meier-Lenz und Kurt Morawiecz (Hrsg.): niedersachsen literarisch. Bio-bibliographische Daten, Fotos und Texte von 65 Autoren aus Niedersachsen. Bremerhaven: Wirtschaftsverlag NW GmbH 1978, S. 161-167  
 Böger, Joachim: "Moritz Jahn – "poeta doctus" des Niederdeutschen". In: Niedersachsen. Zeitschrift für Heimat und Kultur 98/3 (1998). S. 138-139 
 Eberhard Rohse:  "'Und dat in de Chasmersche Kantorije!' Moritz Jahn als Dichter in Geismar. Umrisse eines literarischen Porträts". In: Vera Lenz und Karl Semmelroggen (Hrsg.): 1055-2005. 950 Jahre Geismar. Geschichte und Geschichten. Duderstadt: Mecke Druck und Verlag 2005, S. 205-236, 
 Rohse, Eberhard: "Moritz Jahn in seinen literarischen Werken". In: Eberhard Rohse, Dieter Stellmacher, Dirk Hinrichs, Karl Semmelroggen (Hrsg.): August Hinrichs und Moritz Jahn. Ein literaturwissenschaftlicher Vergleich. 1870–1970. Frankfurt a.M., Berlin, Bern, Bruxelles, New York, Oxford, Wien: Peter Lang. Internationaler Verlag der Wissenschaften 2011 (= Literatur - Sprache - Region, Bd. 8), S. 91-131 -  
 Rohse, Eberhard: "Jenseits von Weltliteratur? Moritz Jahns niederdeutsche Erzählung 'Luzifer'". In: Soltauer Schriften / Binneboom. Schriftenreihe der Freudenthal-Gesellschaft und des Heimatbundes Soltau. Bd. 22 (2016), S. 10-40 - 
 Schrader, Hans-Jürgen: "Moritz Jahns unkepunzialisches Denk- und Poesiemodell". In: Rohse/Stellmacher [...]: August Hinrichs und Moritz Jahn. [...]. Frankfurt a.M. [...] 2011, S. 133-164    
 Stellmacher, Dieter: "August Hinrichs und Moritz Jahn in der niederdeutschen Literatur". In: Rohse/Stellmacher [...] August Hinrichs und Moritz Jahn. [...]. Frankfurt a.M. [...] 2011, S. 165-175
 Heise, Klaus: Kennen Sie diesen Moritz Jahn? Ein Ausflug in das persönliche Umfeld des Dichters. In: Rohse/Stellmacher [...]: August Hinrichs und Moritz Jahn. [...]. Frankfurt a.M. [...] 2011, S. 19-38 
 Strathmann, Peter: "Zur Figur des Ulenspiegel in Moritz Jahns Gedichtzyklus 'Ulenspegel un Jan Dood'. Mit einer Nachschrift zur Aktualität der Rezeption". In: Eulenspiegel-Jahrbuch 48/49 (2008/2009), S. 103-120 -  

 Works 
 Die Geschichte von den Leuten an der Außenföhrde. Junge Generation Verlag, Berlin 1930Boleke Roleffs. Eine niederdeutsche Erzählung. Spielmeyer, Göttingen 1930
 Unkepunz. Ein deutsches Gesicht. Spielmeyer, Göttingen 1931
 Frangula oder Die himmlischen Weiber im Wald. Reclam, Leipzig 1933
 Ulenspegel un Jan Dood. Niederdeutsche Gedichte. Verlag Westphal, Lübeck 1933
 Im weiten Land. Erzählungen. Langen Müller, München 1938
 Die Gleichen. Langen Müller, München 1939
 Das Denkmal des Junggesellen. Eine harmlose Geschichte. Langen Müller, München 1942
 Moritz. Das Denkmal des Junggesellen. Eine harmlose Geschichte. Bertelsmann, Gütersloh 1948
 De Moorfro. Verlag der Fehrs-Gilde, Hamburg 1950
 Luzifer''. Verlag der Fehrs-Gilde, Hamburg 1955

1884 births
1979 deaths
People from Osterholz
20th-century German novelists
Writers from Göttingen
German poets
German male novelists
German male poets
Nazi Party members
Commanders Crosses of the Order of Merit of the Federal Republic of Germany
20th-century German male writers